Scott William Arniel (born September 17, 1962) is a Canadian former professional ice hockey player and current associate coach of the National Hockey League's Winnipeg Jets. Previously, he was the head coach of the Columbus Blue Jackets and associate coach of the New York Rangers and Washington Capitals.

Playing career

Junior hockey
After entering the major junior ranks with the Kingston Canadians of the Ontario Major Junior Hockey League (OMJHL) in 1978–79, Arniel switched to the Quebec Major Junior Hockey League the next season to join the Cornwall Royals. Arniel played a pivotal role in the club's 1981 Memorial Cup championship with a hat trick in an 8–2 win over the Kitchener Rangers on May 10, 1981.

Professional career
That off-season, he was selected by the Winnipeg Jets 22nd overall in the 1981 NHL Entry Draft and immediately began playing for the team, making his NHL debut in 1981–82, appearing in 17 games. He was, however, returned to junior with the Royals, who had been realigned in the Ontario Hockey League (OHL), later that season. The reassignment to junior gave Arniel the opportunity to play at the 1982 World Junior Championships, helping Team Canada to their first-ever gold medal at the tournament.

In 1982–83, Arniel joined the Jets full-time and recorded 18 points in his rookie season. He went on to play five seasons in his initial stint with the Jets, including a career-high 56-point campaign with the team in 1983–84. He joined the Buffalo Sabres in 1986–87, going on to play four seasons with Buffalo, before returning to the Jets in 1990–91.

After splitting the 1991–92 season between the Boston Bruins and the New Haven Nighthawks and Maine Mariners of the American Hockey League (AHL), Arniel played the remainder of his career in the minor leagues, spending time with the San Diego Gulls, Houston Aeros, Utah Grizzlies and Manitoba Moose of the International Hockey League (IHL). He retired following the 1998–99 season.

Coaching career
Arniel began his coaching career as an assistant coach in 1995 while still playing for the Houston Aeros of the IHL as a mid-season replacement.  After retiring as a player in 1999, he joined the coaching staff of the Manitoba Moose as an assistant.  He held that position for three years until 2002, when he was named to the Buffalo Sabres' coaching staff as an assistant.

After four years with the Sabres, Arniel returned to the Moose as their new head coach when he was hired by their parent club, the Vancouver Canucks.  Arniel led the team to the league's best regular season record in 2008–09 and a berth in the Calder Cup finals, earning him the Louis A. R. Pieri Memorial Award as coach of the year.

Arniel returned to the National Hockey League as a head coach in 2010, when he was hired by the Columbus Blue Jackets.  Arniel replaced interim coach Claude Noel, who coincidentally was hired as his replacement in Manitoba.  After only one and a half seasons behind the Blue Jackets' bench, Arniel was fired in January 2012.

In June 2012, the Canucks rehired Arniel to coach the Chicago Wolves, their new AHL affiliate.   In the summer of 2013, Arniel left the Canucks organization, along with head coach Alain Vigneault, to join the New York Rangers. On April 7, 2018, Arniel was fired along with head coach Alain Vigneault and assistant coach Darryl Williams. On August 6, 2018 the reigning Stanley Cup Champions Washington Capitals hired Arniel as an assistant coach to replace Lane Lambert.

Personal life
He has a nephew, Jamie Arniel, who has been drafted into the NHL by the Boston Bruins and played one game for the team during the 2010-11 NHL season.  Scott and his wife, Lia have two children and make their home in Crofton, Maryland during the season and Winnipeg during the off-season.

Scott was inducted into the Kingston and District Sports Hall of Fame on May 2, 2008.

Awards
Kingston and District Sports Hall of Fame, inducted May 2, 2008.
Louis A. R. Pieri Memorial Award (AHL coach of the year), 2009.

Career statistics

Regular season and playoffs

International

Coaching record

NHL coaching statistics

AHL coaching statistics

References

External links

1962 births
Boston Bruins players
Buffalo Sabres coaches
Buffalo Sabres players
Canadian ice hockey coaches
Canadian ice hockey left wingers
Chicago Wolves coaches
Columbus Blue Jackets coaches
Cornwall Royals (OHL) players
Cornwall Royals (QMJHL) players
Houston Aeros (1994–2013) players
Ice hockey people from Ontario
Living people
Maine Mariners players
Manitoba Moose (IHL) players
Manitoba Moose coaches
New Haven Nighthawks players
New York Rangers coaches
San Diego Gulls (IHL) players
Sportspeople from Kingston, Ontario
Utah Grizzlies (IHL) players
Winnipeg Jets (1979–1996) draft picks
Winnipeg Jets (1979–1996) players
Winnipeg Jets coaches
Canadian expatriate ice hockey players in the United States